The Nigerian Association of Mathematical Physics is a professional academic association of Nigerian mathematical physicists. The association is governed by its Council, which is chaired by the association's President, according to a set of Statutes and Standing Orders.

Notable members
Professor Awele Maduemezia
Professor Garba Babaji

References

Professional associations based in Nigeria
Mathematical physics